Gällö is a locality situated in Bräcke Municipality, Jämtland County, Sweden with 692 inhabitants in 2020.
The localty is located next to the E14 road, as well as the Central line railway. The Norrtåg regional trains stops at the Gällö railway station.

References 

Populated places in Bräcke Municipality
Jämtland